Deon Hotto Kavendji (born 29 October 1990) is a Namibian international footballer who plays for Orlando Pirates and for the Namibia football team.

In May 2015, he scored two goals in the 2015 COSAFA Cup final to help Namibia win their first international trophy.

International career

International goals
Scores and results list Namibia's goal tally first.

References

1991 births
Living people
Sportspeople from Swakopmund
Namibian men's footballers
Namibian expatriate footballers
Namibia international footballers
2019 Africa Cup of Nations players
Association football midfielders
Expatriate soccer players in South Africa
Namibian expatriate sportspeople in South Africa
Lamontville Golden Arrows F.C. players
Bloemfontein Celtic F.C. players
Bidvest Wits F.C. players
Orlando Pirates F.C. players